Riojasuchus is an extinct genus of Late Triassic (Norian) quadrupedal archosaur. Riojasuchus is a member of Ornithosuchidae, a family of facultatively bipedal carnivores that were geographically widespread during the Late Triassic. Two other genera, Ornithosuchus and Venaticosuchus, are currently known. The holotype specimen is PVL 3827. It was found in the Los Colorados Formation of the Ischigualasto-Villa Unión Basin in northwestern Argentina.

Discovery and naming 
The holotype specimen is PVL 3827, consisting of a mostly complete crania and a partial postcrania. A majority of the postcranial material was preserved. The skeleton was found with others in the upper section of the Los Colorados Formation. Other than the holotype, it is known from three skeletons.

Description 
 

Distinguishing characteristics 
Many characteristics were identified by Bonaparte in 1969. They are listed below:

a preorbital vacuity well bordered by protruding edges of the smaller preorbital opening, found in Ornithosuchus;
an outgoing lateral lacrimal edge;
an infratemporal fenestra present in the shortest adult skull with mandibular fenestra;
the top of the surangular laterally pointed, and with a small prearticular process;
short atlas and cervical vertebrae, all with a ventral keel;
an ilium, pubis and femur, with the talus and calcaneus of the type of Ornithosuchus
and median orbits with a higher bottom than in Ornithosuchus.

Classification 
 

Riojasuchus is a member of Ornithosuchidae, a family of facultatively bipedal carnivores that were geographically widespread during the Late Triassic. Two other genera, Ornithosuchus and Venaticosuchus, are currently known. The group was originally considered to be related to dinosaurs, before many phylogenetical analysises.

Below is a phylogenetic cladogram by Butler et al. in 2011 showing the cladistics of Archosauriformes, focusing mostly on Pseudosuchia: Clade names follow Nesbitt 2011.

Paleoecology 

Fossils of Riojasuchas are found in the Los Colorados Formation, a Late Triassic unit in Argentina, and date to approximately 217 to 215 million years ago. At that age, it is the youngest ornithosuchid known. It lived alongside the protosuchid Hemiprotosuchus; the sphenosuchid Pseudohesperosuchus; the stagonolepidid Neoaetosauroides; the melanorosaurid Strenusaurus; and the riojasaurid Riojasaurus.

References 

Ornithosuchids
Triassic archosaurs
Norian life
Late Triassic reptiles of South America
Triassic Argentina
Fossils of Argentina
Los Colorados Formation
Fossil taxa described in 1969
Taxa named by José Bonaparte
Prehistoric pseudosuchian genera